Munronia is a genus of flowering plants in the family Meliaceae. Its native distribution is tropical and subtropical Asia.

The name Munronia is a taxonomic patronym honoring the English botanist William Munro (1818 - 1880), a plant collector in India, Kashmir, and Barbados. A taxonomic anagram derived from Munronia is Nurmonia, a confamilial genus synonym of Turraea.

References 

Meliaceae genera
Plants described in 1839
Meliaceae